Xyleutes unilinea is a moth in the family Cossidae. It was described by Harrison Gray Dyar Jr. in 1925 and is found in Mexico.

References

Xyleutes
Moths described in 1925